Sadow may refer to the following places in Poland:
Sadów, Silesian Voivodeship
Sądów, Lubusz Voivodeship
Sądów, West Pomeranian Voivodeship